Bunnaloo is a village community in the central southern part of the Riverina and situated about  west of Mathoura and  south west of Deniliquin.  In 2006, Bunnaloo had a population of 126.

History
The area that is now known as Bunnaloo originally was split between two properties: the Cobram Station and Perricoota. In 1899, a crown lease on part of the Perricoota land expired and the New South Wales Government split a paddock into six 700 acre homestead farms to be sold in 1901. Further subdividing of the Cobram Estate land allowed for more residents to move to the area.

The first Post Office in Bunnaloo was run from the home of a Mrs Hawkins, replacing the weekly mail run from Mathoura by Syd Larcombe. In 1924 a new railway line was laid, with Bunnaloo homing a new station. This allowed for easy transport of wheat or stock (previously it had to be carted 18 miles to Mathoura).

In 1926, Victor Hicks built a store in Bunnaloo. The Post Office was moved here, becoming the first official Bunnaloo Post Office (until its closure in 1974).

Education
In 1919 the parents of Bunnaloo purchased and moved a building from Womboota to a property to be used as a school. This was run by subsidised teachers prior to government teachers being supplied. For the school's final years it was again run by subsidised teachers. In 1927, the school was closed and the building sold to parents of the town of Walliston.

Bunnaloo Public School opened in 1928 and is still running (despite closing from 1944 to 1951 due to WWII). Currently, it has approx. 50 students attending. Students in Years K to 6 attend from all around the area. The current principal is Darren Devereux.

Sport
Until its disbandment at the end of the 1989 season, the Bunnaloo Football Club operated for many years. It won back-to-back premierships in 1988 and 1989.

In the 1960s, the Bunnaloo Table Tennis Club was established and operated. Teams of four men and two women competed for the McHugh Holschier trophy.

Bunnaloo in conjunction with Mathoura fields a cricket team in the Goulburn Murray Cricket League known as the Northern United Cricket Club. Prior to this, the Bunnaloo Cricket Club operated from the Bunnaloo Recreation Reserve.

Amenities

The first Bunnaloo Hall was built in 1927 at a cost of £702. A supper room was added in 1945, and throughout the late 1950s and 1960s fundraisers were held to refurbish the hall. In the early 1980s, a new Bunnaloo Hall was built as part of the Bunnaloo Recreation Reserve. This includes an oval, cricket nets, and tennis courts.

The Bunnaloo Uniting Church (formerly the Bunnaloo Methodist Church) opened in 1966.

A petrol station still operates, currently known as Riverine Petroleum. It resides on the intersection of Fitzroy Street and Bunnaloo Road.

Climate

References

External links

Towns in the Riverina
Towns in New South Wales
Murray River Council